Norwegian Cricket Board is the official governing body of the sport of cricket in Norway. Its headquarters is located in Oslo, Norway. Norwegian Cricket Board is Norway's representative at the International Cricket Council and is an associate member and has been a member of that body since 2000. It is also a member of the European Cricket Council.

References

External links
Cricinfo-Norway

Cricket administration
Cricket in Norway
Sports organisations of Norway